Asai is a Japanese surname which means "shallow well". Notable people with the surname include:

Akihiro Asai (born 1975 ), race car driver
Asai Chū (1856–1907), Japanese painter
Eriko Asai (born 1959), long-distance runner
, Japanese ice hockey player
, Japanese baseball player
Katsuaki Asai (born 1942), high-ranking teacher of Aikido in Germany
, Japanese writer
Tetsuhiko Asai (1935–2006), Shotokan karate master
Yoshihiro Asai (born 1966), professional masked wrestler wrestling under the name Ultimo Dragon
Yoshiko Asai (born 1941), female voice actor

Fictional Characters 

 , a character in the manga series Uzaki-chan Wants to Hang Out!
 Akihiko Asai, Ami's father

See also
 Azai clan

Japanese-language surnames